Joseph F. Smart, a Democrat, was a member of the Wisconsin State Assembly during the 1913 Session. Smart worked for the Great Northern Life Insurance Company of Wausau. He also was a manager of the Boston Red Sox baseball team. He was born on January 14, 1870, in Cleveland, Ohio. Smart died on April 1, 1938 in Milwaukee, Wisconsin where he had lived.

References

Politicians from Cleveland
Politicians from Milwaukee
Businesspeople from Wisconsin
Boston Red Sox personnel
1870 births
1938 deaths
Democratic Party members of the Wisconsin State Assembly